Cerro Cebollar is a  volcano including andesitic-dacitic irregular lava flows. They contain 61.7–61.8% SiO2; the volcano itself is a few million years old judging by its appearance. It is covered by a rhyolitic pumice coming from a neighbouring caldera. It is part of the Cerro de las Cuevas-Cerro Palpana volcanic chain.

References

External links 
 

Volcanoes of Antofagasta Region